The Third Saturday in October is the Alabama–Tennessee football rivalry, an American college football rivalry game played annually by the Crimson Tide of the University of Alabama and the Volunteers of the University of Tennessee. It is known as the Third Saturday in October because the game was traditionally played at such date prior to the 1992 football season, when the Southeastern Conference (SEC) split into its East and West divisions. From 1995 to 2015, it was only scheduled for that date six times, though it was again scheduled for that date from 2016 through 2019 and in 2022. Alabama leads the series 58–39–7. At 39 wins, Tennessee has more victories over Alabama than any other program in college football.

Series history
The first game was played in 1901 in Birmingham, a 6–6 tie. From 1903 to 1913, Alabama dominated the series, only losing once and never allowing a touchdown by the Volunteers.

Beginning in 1928, the rivalry was scheduled on its "traditional" date. Robert Neyland, Tennessee's coach and namesake of the present Tennessee stadium, began challenging Alabama for their perennial spot on top of the conference standings. It was officially given the name Third Saturday in October 1939. Both Robert Neyland and Bear Bryant made the rivalry heated during their tenure at Tennessee and Alabama.

The Alabama–Tennessee game has been played in three locations: Birmingham, Alabama; Knoxville, Tennessee; and Tuscaloosa, Alabama. In the first four (1901–1908) meetings, the game was held in Birmingham, Alabama. In 1909, the home and home series began, though most of Alabama's home games against Tennessee were played in Birmingham. The teams did play in Tuscaloosa a few times through 1930. The game was not played in Tuscaloosa from 1930 until 1999. Alabama leads the series in all three venues: for games contested in Birmingham, 21–14–6; in Knoxville, 27–21–1; and in Tuscaloosa, 10–4. Tennessee won the most recent game, played on October 15, 2022, 52–49, snapping a 15-game losing streak.

Alabama and Tennessee both have 12 shutouts in the series.

Victory cigars
In the 1950s, Jim Goostree, the head athletic trainer for Alabama, began another tradition as he began handing out cigars following a victory over the Volunteers. Both teams continued the tradition for some time, though kept it secret due to NCAA rules concerning extra benefits and tobacco products. Alabama publicly restarted the tradition in 2005, though as a result, self-reported an NCAA violation. Every year since 2007, Alabama knowingly violates the NCAA rule and reports the violation in honor of tradition.

Streaks 

The Alabama–Tennessee rivalry has been known for streaks. In the first major streak of the series, Bama won seven straight over the Vols from 1905 to 1913 (the two teams did not play in 1910 and 1911), outscoring the Vols 112–0 in the process.

Alabama had the longest winning streak of the series, extending 15 games from 2007 to 2021, until October 15, 2022 when Tennessee defeated Alabama 52–49, the first time Tennessee defeated Nick Saban. An eleven-game Alabama streak (1971-1981) was broken in 1982 when Johnny Majors led the Vols to an upset victory over Bear Bryant and the Tide.

Alabama had a nine-game unbeaten streak from 1986 to 1994, including a tie in 1993 which was later forfeited due to NCAA sanctions. The streak was broken by Tennessee in 1995 when the Vols beat the Tide 41–14. Tennessee began their own seven game win streak that night, which was broken when Alabama defeated the Vols 34–14 in 2002. To date, Alabama maintains the longest streak of victories over the vols at fifteen. The current streak is held by the Vols.

Game results 
Rankings are from the AP Poll

Notable games 

1901: 1901 was the first meeting between the two teams. It ended early in a 6–6 tie, when fans rushed onto the field after a controversial offside call and the umpires were unable to clear out the crowd in the second half. In the game, J. L. Broug scored for Tennessee and A. W. Stewart scored for Alabama.

1909 Tennessee fans chased referee R. T. Elgin away from the stadium. Elgin jumped aboard a moving streetcar.

1939: In 1939, #5 Tennessee defeated Alabama 21–0. At this time, the Alabama–Tennessee rivalry was officially designated as Third Saturday in October.

1950: Alabama had a  3–0 first quarter lead with his 20-yard field goal. Tennessee responded with a two-yard Andy Kozar touchdown run in the second quarter to give the Vols a 7–3 halftime lead. After a 43-yard Bobby Marlow touchdown run in the third gave Alabama a 9–7 lead, Kozar scored the game-winning touchdown on a fourth-and-one play, from the Alabama one-yard line, with less than one minute remaining in the game for a 14–9 Tennessee victory.

1964: In 1964, David Ray gave the Crimson Tide an early 3–0 lead after he connected on a 30-yard field goal in the first quarter. Alabama then extended their lead to 16–0 at halftime with a pair of second-quarter touchdowns. The first came on a one-yard Steve Sloan run and the second after Wayne Cook blocked a Tennessee punt that Gaylon McCollough returned 22-yards for a touchdown. The Volunteers cut the Tide's lead in half to 16–8 with a seven-yard Hal Wantland touchdown run and two-point conversion in the third quarter. A 23-yard Ray field goal in the fourth quarter provided for the final 19–8 Alabama victory.

1965: In a game that saw multiple turnovers result in failed touchdown opportunities, Alabama tied Tennessee 7–7 at Legion Field. After a scoreless first quarter, both teams scored their only touchdown in the second. Stan Mitchell scored first for the Vols on a one-yard run and Steve Sloan followed for Alabama with his one-yard run. The Crimson Tide had a chance to win the game in the final minute of the game. With only 0:36 remaining in the game, Alabama had possession at the Tennessee six-yard line. However, Alabama quarterback Ken Stabler thought the Tide gained a first down on the previous play and threw the ball out-of-bounds on a fourth down play and turned the ball over on downs back to the Vols. Tennessee then ran out the clock for the tie.

1966: A week following Alabama's win over Clemson, Alabama regained the No. 3 position in the AP Poll prior to the game against Tennessee. At a rain-soaked Neyland Stadium, Alabama overcame a 10–0 fourth quarter deficit and defeated the Vols 11–10 and preserved their perfect record. Tennessee scored all of their points in the first quarter. The first points came on a six-yard Dewey Warren touchdown pass to Austin Denney and next on a 40-yard Gary Wright field goal for a 10–0 lead. Still up by 10, the Crimson Tide made their comeback in the fourth quarter. Ken Stabler scored on a one-yard touchdown run and then successfully converted the two-point conversion on a short pass to Wayne Cook that made the score 10–8. With 3:23 left in the game, Steve Davis kicked the 17-yard, game-winning field goal that made the score 11–10. The Volunteers did manage to set up a 19-yard field goal attempt that went wide in the final 0:20 of the contest. The victory improved Alabama's all-time record against Tennessee to 23–19–7.

1967: In 1967, both Alabama and Tennessee were ranked in top ten. The game started with Walter Chadwick scored on a one-yard touchdown run for the Vols, Alabama responded with an eight-yard touchdown that tied the game 7–7 at the end of the first quarter. The score remained tied at the half after a scoreless second quarter.

Tennessee then took a 17–7 lead in the third quarter on an 11-yard Chadwick touchdown pass to Ken DeLong and a 47-yard Karl Kremser field goal. Alabama responded with their final points early in the fourth quarter on a one-yard Ed Morgan touchdown run, but a pass was later intercepted by Albert Dorsey and returned 31-yards for a touchdown and a 24–13 Vols victory. The Tennessee win was also their first over the Crimson Tide since the 1960 season.

1968: In 1968, coach Bryant decide to go for the victory instead of a tie in the final minutes of the game, and after the failed two-point conversion the Volunteers held onto a 10–9 victory at Knoxville. Tennessee took an early 7–0 lead in the first quarter after Richmond Flowers scored on a one-yard touchdown run. Alabama responded later in the quarter with a 28-yard Mike Dean field goal that made the score 7–3. The score remained the same through the fourth quarter when Karl Kremser kicked what was then a SEC record 54-yard field goal that extended the Volunteers lead to 10–3.

After the Tennessee field goal, the Crimson Tide had their most sustained drive of the game. The 80-yard drive culminated in a four-yard Donnie Sutton touchdown reception from Scott Hunter that made the score 10–9. However, instead of playing for the tie and kicking the extra point, coach Bryant elected to go for the win on a two-point conversion. On the attempt, Joe Kelley failed to complete the pass to Sutton and Tennessee won the game as a result 10–9.

1972: After a scoreless first quarter, the Crimson Tide took a 3–0 lead into halftime after Bill Davis connected on a 31-yard field goal in the second. Tennessee then took a 7–3 lead on a two-yard Condredge Holloway touchdown run in the third, and extended it to 10–3 with a 36-yard Ricky Townsend field goal in the fourth quarter.

With 2:39 left in the game, Alabama took possession at the Vols 48-yard line, and three plays later Wilbur Jackson scored on a two-yard run. On the Tennessee possession that ensued, John Mitchell recovered a Holloway fumble at the Vols' 17-yard line. On the next play, Terry Davis gave Alabama a 17–10 lead with his touchdown run with just over one minute left in the game. The victory improved Alabama's all-time record against Tennessee to 25–23–7.

1982: Bear Bryant makes his final trip to Neyland Stadium. #2 Alabama's 11-game win streak over the Vols comes to an end 35–28 as UT coach Johnny Majors is carried to mid-field in celebration to shake Bryant's hand one last time.  At the time, the largest crowd in NCAA football history witnessed this game, partly due to the World's Fair being in Knoxville in 1982.

1989: In 1989, both teams entered the game undefeated and ranked in the top ten.  #10 Alabama defeated #6 Tennessee in an offensive shootout, 47–30.

1990: 2–3 Alabama traveled to Knoxville to face undefeated, #3 Tennessee. The score was tied at 6–6 with 1:35 remaining when UT kicker Greg Harris' 50 yard field goal attempt  was blocked by Alabama's Stacy Harrison. The ball bounced all the way to the Tennessee 37 yard line, setting up a field goal attempt for Alabama kicker Philip Doyle 3 plays later.  Doyle converted the 48 yard attempt as time expired, giving Alabama a stunning 9–6 upset victory, considered by some the biggest upset in series history.

1993: 5–1, #10 Tennessee led #2, defending national champion Alabama at Legion Field 17–9 with 1:44 remaining. Alabama quarterback Jay Barker then led an 83-yard touchdown drive to close the gap to 17–15 before star wide receiver David Palmer ran in a two-point conversion to tie the game at 17 with only 21 seconds remaining. Tennessee elected to run out the clock, preserving the 17–17 tie - the last tie in Alabama football history — and ending Alabama's 28 game winning streak. Alabama later had to forfeit this game and it is officially considered a Tennessee win.

1995: Having not defeated Alabama since 1985, #6 Tennessee and sophomore quarterback Peyton Manning defeated #10 Alabama in a rout. Unlike past contests, this game was dominated by the Volunteers from the beginning — Peyton Manning threw an 80 yard touchdown pass to Joey Kent on the very first play of the game.

1998: The Vols continue their unexpected and undefeated march to Tempe and the national championship by defeating Alabama 35–18 in Knoxville. Tennessee extend their streak to four in the row against Alabama.

2002: #19 Alabama, banned from postseason play due to NCAA probation, defeated #16 Tennessee 34–14 in Knoxville, ending Tennessee's seven-game winning streak - their longest streak in series history.

2003: #22 Tennessee, fighting to stay alive in the SEC East, traveled to Tuscaloosa to take on the unranked Crimson Tide. The two teams went to an unprecedented five overtime periods before Tennessee finally breaks the ice in the fifth overtime scoring a touchdown and the mandatory two-point conversion. Alabama would fail to answer the touchdown and Tennessee left Tuscaloosa victorious with a 51–43 win in the longest game in either team's history.

2005: Tennessee returned to Tuscaloosa ranked 17th after a disappointing 3–2 start following their preseason #2 ranking. Alabama came in ranked #5 and undefeated, their highest ranking entering the game since 1993. A defensive struggle ensued, with neither team able to find the endzone. With the score tied at 3–3, Tennessee appeared ready to score the game's first touchdown with 5:08 remaining.  Running back Cory Anderson caught a swing pass and reached the two yard line before Alabama's Roman Harper knocked the ball loose and through the endzone for a touchback.  Alabama quarterback Brodie Croyle then drove the Tide down into field goal range where Jamie Christensen kicked the game-winning field goal with 13 seconds left to give the Crimson Tide a 6–3 win and keep their undefeated season alive.

2009: Despite #1 Alabama entering the game as a 14-point favorite, the Crimson Tide struggled with the Volunteers, holding only a slim 12–3 lead late in the fourth quarter.  With Alabama attempting to kill the clock, eventual Heisman Trophy winner Mark Ingram II fumbled for the first time in 296 carries, giving Tennessee the ball in Alabama territory.  Tennessee scored the first touchdown of the game eight plays later, making the score 12–10. Tennessee then recovered an onside kick at their own 41 yard line, needing only a field goal to pull off the upset. After reaching the Alabama 28 yard line, Tennessee attempted a would-be game-winning field goal of 43 yards. Alabama's standout defensive lineman, Terrence Cody, blocked the low line-drive kick, his second blocked field goal of the quarter, preserving the 12–10 Alabama victory en route to an eventual National Championship.

2015: Tennessee came to Tuscaloosa immediately after a big win against rival Georgia and hoped to get another upset, while Alabama was focused on keeping its College Football Playoff hopes alive. At half time, the game was tied 7–7. Alabama kicked two field goals in the second half, giving them a 13–7 lead in the 4th quarter. With 5:49 left on the clock, Tennessee running back Jalen Hurd scored a touchdown to give the Vols a late 14–13 lead.  Alabama responded with a lengthy drive capped off by a 14-yard touchdown run by eventual Heisman Trophy winner Derrick Henry. Alabama attempted a two-point conversion to stretch the lead to a touchdown, but failed, leaving the score at 19–14.  On the ensuing drive, Tennessee quarterback Joshua Dobbs was sacked by linebacker Ryan Anderson, leading to a fumble recovered by A'Shawn Robinson.  The Crimson Tide then killed the clock, preserving a narrow 19–14 victory and extending their winning streak in the series to 9 games. Alabama would eventually win the College Football Playoff national championship that season.

2022: The two teams entered the game undefeated for the first time since 1989. #6 Tennessee jumped out to an early 28–10 lead before Alabama quarterback Bryce Young brought the #3 Tide back to take the lead in the third quarter. The teams traded touchdowns up to the final minute, leaving the score tied 49–49. Alabama had the ball at Tennessee's 32-yard line with under a minute remaining, where Tennessee forced three straight incompletions. Alabama missed a field goal with 15 seconds remaining, and Tennessee quarterback Hendon Hooker was able to get the Vols in range for a game winning field goal as time expired. Tennessee kicker Chase McGrath converted the 40-yard attempt, breaking Tennessee's 15-year losing streak to Alabama. Tennessee fans at Neyland stormed the field and tore the goalposts down in celebration.

Rivalry ties
Both football programs share very notable people. Bill Battle, Alabama's athletic director from 2013–17, was the head coach of Tennessee from 1970–76 and played on the Crimson Tide's 1961 national championship squad.

Former Tennessee athletic director from 2011–17 Dave Hart played basketball for the Crimson Tide under head coach C. M. Newton and earned a master's degree from University of Alabama in 1972 while working as a graduate assistant men's basketball coach. During his time at Alabama, he worked as executive director of athletics.

Lane Kiffin, Alabama's offensive coordinator from 2014–16, was head coach at Tennessee in 2009.

Jeremy Pruitt, Alabama's defensive coordinator from 2016–17, was the head coach at Tennessee from 2018 to 2020.

Butch Jones, former Tennessee head coach from 2013–17, was an analyst for the Alabama Crimson Tide from 2018 to 2020.

See also
 List of NCAA college football rivalry games
 List of most-played college football series in NCAA Division I

References

Further reading 
 

College football rivalries in the United States
Alabama Crimson Tide football
Tennessee Volunteers football
October sporting events
Saturday events